Botswana competed in the 2014 Commonwealth Games in Glasgow, Scotland from July 23 to August 3, 2014.

Medalists

Athletics

In the women's 400 metres final, Botswana's Amantle Montsho placed fourth; she was subsequently suspended after failing a doping test.

Men
Track and road events

Field events

Women

Badminton

Men

Boxing

Men

Women

Judo

Women

Squash

Men
Individual

Table tennis

Men

Women

Mixed

References

Nations at the 2014 Commonwealth Games
Botswana at the Commonwealth Games
2014 in Botswana sport